Uno Mereste (born Uno-Johannes Muskat; 27 May 1928 – 6 December 2009) was an Estonian economist and politician. He was a member of VII, VIII and IX Riigikogu.

References

1928 births
2009 deaths
20th-century Estonian economists
Social Democratic Party (Estonia) politicians
Estonian Reform Party politicians
Members of the Riigikogu, 1992–1995
Members of the Riigikogu, 1995–1999
Members of the Riigikogu, 1999–2003
Recipients of the Order of the White Star, 3rd Class
Tallinn University of Technology alumni
Academic staff of the Tallinn University of Technology